is a railway station on the Nippō Main Line operated by Kyūshū Railway Company in Nakatsu, Ōita, Japan.

Lines

Layout 
The station consists of two side platforms serving two tracks. Both tracks run on the south side of their respective platforms, suggesting that platform 2 was once an island platform but the middle line has been removed. The station building is a wooden structure of traditional Japanese design and houses a staffed ticket window, a waiting area and an automatic ticket vending machine. Access to the opposite side platform is by means of a footbridge.

JR Kyushu ceased to staff the station in March 2015. Thereafter, Nakatsu City authorities managed the ticket window on a kan'i itaku basis.

Adjacent stations

History
The Hōshū Railway was acquired by the Kyushu Railway on 3 September 1901 and the Kyushu Railway was itself nationalised on 1 July 1907. Japanese Government Railways (JGR) designated the station as part of the Hōshū Main Line on 12 October 1909. On 15 December 1923, the station became part of the Nippō Main Line. With the privatization of Japanese National Railways (JNR), the successor of JGR, on 1 April 1987, the station came under the control of JR Kyushu.

Passenger statistics
In fiscal 2015, there were a total of 49,464 boarding passengers, giving a daily average of 136 passengers.

See also
List of railway stations in Japan

References

External links

  

Railway stations in Ōita Prefecture
Railway stations in Japan opened in 1897
Nakatsu, Ōita